Staircase Glacier is a glacier about 8 nautical miles (15 km) long, descending southwest between Mount Francis and Mount Titus into Tucker Glacier, in the Admiralty Mountains. So named by the New Zealand Geological Survey Antarctic Expedition (NZGSAE), 1957–58, for its proximity to the "Staircase" survey station, the latter so designated because a long line of steps were cut in the ice in climbing to it.

References

Glaciers of Victoria Land
Borchgrevink Coast